Ashley Booth (22 October 1937 – 23 March 2014) was a librarian at Regina Public Library.

Booth is best known for his time at St Johnstone where he made 36 appearances for the Perth club from 1962 to 1965. Booth then moved on to East Fife where he made a handful of appearances before suffering serious ligament damage while playing against Dumbarton at Boghead which ultimately ended his playing career.

References

External links
footballdatabase profile

1939 births
Footballers from Aberdeen
2014 deaths
Place of death missing
Scottish footballers
St Johnstone F.C. players
East Fife F.C. players
Scottish Football League players
Association football wing halves
Banks O' Dee F.C. players